2D Materials  is a peer-reviewed scientific journal published by IOP Publishing. It is devoted to publishing fundamental and applied research of the highest quality and impact covering all aspects of graphene and related two-dimensional materials. The editor-in-chief is Wencai Ren (Chinese Academy of Sciences).

Scope 
2D Materials publishes letters, research papers, perspectives, topical reviews, focus issues, and roadmaps across a given subject area. Specific materials of interest will include, but are not limited to:
Graphene and graphene-derived materials
Silicene and germanene/silicane and germanane
Boron nitride
Transition metal dichalcogenides
Two-dimensional topological insulators
Complex oxides
Composite materials
Other novel two-dimensional layered structures

Abstracting and indexing
According to the Journal Citation Reports, the journal had a 2021 impact factor of 6.861.

It is indexed in the following bibliographic databases:
Chemical Abstracts
Ei Compendex
INIS
Inspec
Astrophysics Data System
Scopus
ProQuest SciTech Premium Collection
Web of Science

References

External links
 

Optics journals
IOP Publishing academic journals
Monthly journals